Wagholi is a town in Pune district of Maharashtra, India. It is situated on the outskirts of Pune city so many people working or studying in Pune live here due to lower rents and cost-of-living. It plays an important role in the economic, social, cultural, and educational lives of people in the Pune, Koregaon, and Satara Districts.

According to the 2001 census, this town has a literacy rate of 85.14%, higher than state average of 82.34%.

Government 
The town follows the Gram Panchayat governing system, in which the sarpanch is the democratically elected head of the town. The Talathi and the Gramsevak are servants who assist the Sarpanch in the pursuit of the town's agenda. Politics have been dominated by the Bhoites since India achieved independence.

History 

Wagholi was historically ruled by a leading Maratha clan from the lineage of the Suryavanshi Kshatriya, named Bhoite. Bhoites were Deshmukhs of Pargana (Taluka) Wagholi in the Prant Wai.  Wagholi was an important town of Raygad Ghera; it and nearby Phaltan were the centers of the prominent ruling chiefs of Chhatrapati Shivaji. The Bhoites and Wagholi residents were active in the anti-British movements for the freedom of India. The Wagholi used to be referred to as Sammat in the names of other villages, because in the history of Marathas, the word "Sammat" denotes a Sarkar or Pargana under Bahamani Sultanates. The oldest village of Bhoite, named Tadawale, was called Tadawale Sammat Wagholi, i.e. Tadawale under Pargana Wagholi. The Bhoites, being rulers of Sammat Wagholi, were rendered as Sarsammat (Chief of Sammat) under the Deccan Sultanates.

Education 
Many Wagholi residents attend school in nearby communities, such as Wathar, Satara, and Pune; some attend larger regional or national institutions.

Most schools and colleges are concentrated in Vidyanagar, 1 km away from Wagholi. Schools include:
 Bharat Vidyamandir and Junior College, Wagholi (Science, Commerce, Arts)
 Kala Mahavidyalaya Wagholi, Vidyanagar (Graduation in Arts, Commerce)
 Z.P. School, Wagholi (Primary School)
SNBP International School Wagholi, Best CBSE Board Schools in Pune, Best School Wagholi
EVA WORLD SCHOOL
Lexicon International School Wagholi, Pune
Prodigy Public School
---Colleges---
Raisoni Group of Institutions
G.H. Raisoni Institute of Engineering & Technology(Autonomous)
G.H. Raisoni College of Engineering & Management (Autonomous)
G.H. Raisoni Junior College
JSPM Group
JSPM Imperial College of Engineering & Research
JSPM Bhiwarabai Sawant Engineering College
JSPM Polytechnic
Parvatibai Genaba Moze College of Engineering
Delhi Paramedical and Management Institute-DPMI NexGeN
Lexicon MILE - Management Institute of Leadership and Excellence
Bharatiya Jain Sanghatana's Arts, Commerce & Science College
SATAV Jr College/High School
Wagheshwar Junior College

Transport 
The main means of transportation are the government buses of M.S.R.T.C. (Maharashtra State Road Transport Corporation) and also some private taxis, small vehicles, and trucks. Locals often ride bicycles as well.
Air: The nearest airport is at Pune, which about 100 km away.
Rail: The nearest Station is Wathar, about 7 km away.
Road: The local road network is well developed, connected to state highways at least 9 km away and National Highway 48 about 12 km.

Other Details
The pin code of Wagholi, Pune, Maharashtra is 412207. The post office Wagholi is located in the district Pune, Maharashtra. The first two digit of pin code denotes 41, which is listed in Maharashtra.
Bhooj Adda, Popular Restaurant in Pune.

References 

Cities and towns in Satara district
Villages in Satara district